Floyd Wilson Baker (October 10, 1916 – November 17, 2004) was an American professional baseball third baseman, who played Major League Baseball (MLB) for the St. Louis Browns (1943–1944), Chicago White Sox (1945–1951), Washington Senators (1952–1953), Boston Red Sox (1953–1954), and Philadelphia Phillies (1954–1955). During a 13-season career, Baker posted a .251 batting average, with one home run, and 196 RBI, in 874 games played.

Early years
Baker was born in Luray, Virginia, and attended Luray High School. He gained early recognition as a left-handed batter and right-handed thrower in amateur clubs and broke into the minor leagues in 1938.

Major league career
In , Baker earned his first trial in the major leagues with the St. Louis Browns, after hitting .326 for there San Antonio Missions of the Texas League in 1942. In , his sophomore MLB season, he was a reserve infielder for the 1944 Browns, the only St. Louis-based edition of that franchise to ever win an American League pennant. Baker then appeared in games 5 and 6 of the 1944 World Series against its intercity rivals, the Cardinals, going hitless in two at bats and handling two chances without an error in relief of veteran second baseman Don Gutteridge.

On December 30, 1944, Baker was acquired by the Chicago White Sox, where he played in 590 games over seven seasons. His best overall statistical season came in  when he compiled 40 runs batted in, 101 hits, 15 doubles, four triples, and played 125 games — all career-highs. He hit his lone big-league home run on May 4, a two-run blow struck off Washington's Sid Hudson on May 4 at Comiskey Park. That year Baker also tied the major league mark for a third baseman, taking part in three double plays in one game, and led American League third-sackers in fielding percentage, with .978.

Baker became a Washington scout in 1957. In , the old Senators franchise's first season in Minneapolis–Saint Paul, he returned to uniform as the third base coach for the renamed Minnesota Twins, a position he held through . Baker then resumed his former role as a scout for the Twins until his retirement in 1995.

Later years
During his career as a scout, Baker was based in Youngstown, Ohio, where his feats as a player for the Youngstown Browns were part of local baseball lore. In 1977, The Youngstown Vindicator reported: "Floyd Baker, who thrilled local Middle-Atlantic League fans with his classy fielding, still has his hand in the game. A local resident, Baker scouts for Minnesota. Baker, incidentally, started a triple play in the first game he played here".

Floyd Baker died in Youngstown at the age of 88. He was buried in Forest Lawn Memorial Park Cemetery.

References

External links

Floyd Baker at SABR (Baseball BioProject)
Floyd Baker at The Baseball Page

1916 births
2004 deaths
Baseball players from Virginia
Baseball players from Youngstown, Ohio
Boston Red Sox players
Chicago White Sox players
Major League Baseball scouts
Major League Baseball third base coaches
Major League Baseball third basemen
Mayfield Clothiers players
Milwaukee Brewers (minor league) players
Minnesota Twins coaches
Minnesota Twins scouts
People from Luray, Virginia
Philadelphia Phillies players
St. Louis Browns players
San Antonio Missions players
Springfield Browns players
Toledo Mud Hens players
Washington Senators (1901–1960) players
Washington Senators (1901–60) scouts
Youngstown Browns players